Baños District is one of seven districts of the province Lauricocha in Peru.

References